The 1993 Cronulla-Sutherland Sharks season was the 27th in the club's history. They competed in the NSWRL's 1993 Winfield Cup premiership.

Ladder

Balmain were stripped of 2 competition points due to an illegal replacement in one game.

References

Cronulla-Sutherland Sharks seasons
Cronulla-Sutherland Sharks season